John Waldon Corcoran (June 13, 1904 – January 8, 1987) was an American football player. He played college football for St. Thomas in 1928 and Saint Louis in 1929 and in the National Football League (NFL) as a center and guard for the Minneapolis Red Jackets in 1930. He appeared in five NFL games, three as a starter.

References

1904 births
1987 deaths
Minneapolis Red Jackets players
Players of American football from Minnesota
St. Thomas (Minnesota) Tommies football players
American football centers
Saint Louis Billikens football players
American football guards